The Saxon Chronicles is a double DVD showcasing one of the NWOBHM pioneers spanning 23 years of their career. It features a 2001 concert, interviews, videos, and on-tour documentaries.

Disc 1
Wacken Open Air Festival, Germany 2001 (97 min. video)
 "Motorcycle Man"
 "Dogs of War"
 "Heavy Metal Thunder"
 "Cut Out the Disease"
 "Solid Ball of Rock"
 "Metalhead"
 "The Eagle Has Landed"
 "Conquistador (Drum Solo)"
 "Crusader"
 "Power and the Glory"
 "Princess of the Night"
 "Wheels of Steel (Guitar Solo)"
 "Strong Arm of the Law"
 "20,000 Ft."
 "Denim and Leather"

Interview with Biff Byford (13 min. video)
Moving Main Menu with sound
Title Selection with sound
Sound and subtitle selection
Discography

Disc 2
Saxon on Tour (approx. 36 min Video)
Saxon Videos (approx 37 min. 8 video clips) 
 "Suzie Hold On"
 "Power & The Glory"
 "Nightmare"
 "Back on the Streets Again"
 "Rockin' Again"
 "(Requiem) We Will Remember"
 "Unleash the Beast" + Behind the Scenes
 "Killing Ground"

Saxon on TV (approx. 16 min. video: Interviews, History, TV-Appearances)
 "And the Bands Played On" 
 "Back on the Streets" 
 "Never Surrender" 
 "Denim and Leather" 
 "Wheels of Steel"

Interactive Features: Interactive Menus & Scene Access
Text/Photo Gallery: Photo Gallery and Press Clippings
DVD-Rom Features: Web Links

Additional notes
DVD Features: Full Frame - 1:33 
Region 0
Disc 1 Audio: Dolby Digital 5.1 - English
Disc 2 Audio: Dolby Digital 2.0 - English

Saxon (band) video albums
2003 video albums
SPV/Steamhammer video albums